The United States contains varied landforms across its territory. These include:

List of beaches in the United States
List of fjords of the United States
List of glaciers in the United States
List of islands of the United States
List of lakes of the United States
List of rivers of the United States
List of volcanoes in the United States
List of waterfalls of the United States
Mountain peaks of the United States
Appalachian Mountains
Black Hills
Cascade Range
Rocky Mountains
List of mountains of the United States
Northern Rocky Mountains